WIDE-LP (99.1 FM, "CityWIDE") is an American low-power FM radio station licensed to serve the community of Madison, Wisconsin. The station is owned and operated by the non-profit Madison Mainstream Radio, Inc.

External links
WIDE-LP official website
 

IDE-LP
IDE-LP
Radio stations established in 2007